The Bhikaji Cama Place metro station is located on the Pink Line of the Delhi Metro. The station was opened on 6 August 2018. Bhikaji Cama Place Metro Station is situated on the Ring Road. It is named after Bhikaji Cama the Indian freedom fighter, who is credited with creating an early version of the Flag of India based on the Calcutta Flag

The station

Station layout

Entry/Exit

Connections

Bus
Delhi Transport Corporation bus routes number 323, 392, 392B, 398, 442, 448EXT, 479, 479CL, 529SPL, 543A, 567, 567A, 568, 568A, 569, 588, 611A, 711, 711A, 724, 724C, 724EXT, 780, 794, 794A, 864, 874, 984A, AC-479, AC-711, AC-724, AC-724A
Anand Vihar ISBT Terminal – Gurugram Bus Stand,
Anand Vihar ISBT Terminal – Gurugram Bus Stand AC
TMS (-)
TMS-Azadpur-Lajpat,
TMS-LajpatNagar,
TMS-PBagh serves the station from nearby Hyatt Hotel bus stop.

See also

Delhi
List of Delhi Metro stations
Transport in Delhi
Delhi Metro Rail Corporation
Delhi Suburban Railway
Inner Ring Road, Delhi
South Extension
Delhi Monorail
Delhi Transport Corporation
South Delhi
New Delhi
National Capital Region (India)
List of rapid transit systems
List of metro systems

References

External links

 Delhi Metro Rail Corporation Ltd. (Official site)
 Delhi Metro Annual Reports
 
 UrbanRail.Net – Descriptions of all metro systems in the world, each with a schematic map showing all stations.

Delhi Metro stations
Railway stations in South Delhi district